Dave Dyment is a Canadian artist and curator currently practising in Sackville, New Brunswick. Dyment was the 2008 artist-in-residence at the Glenfiddich distillery in Dufftown, Scotland and was an Chalmers Arts Fellow in 2009. He is the co-Director of Struts Gallery & Faucet Media Arts Centre in Sackville.

Publications

 Students Draw Scenes Scenes From Movies That Were Filmed At Their School. Artist Publication. Winter 2013. 
 Old Man Deciphering a Briefcase. C Magazine. Artist Project. Spring 2013.
 Spiral Jetée (for CM and KH). Blue Note Book Vol 7 No. 1. Bristol. Uk. October 2012. 
 Hofercrate. Artist publication. Summer 2012.
 No Expectations. Artist Book. Fall 2011.
 Pop Quiz. Paul+Wendy Projects, 2010.
 Sgt Pepper’s Extended Lonely Hearts Club Band. Paul+Wendy Projects, 2009.
 CCL1. Centre for Culture and Leisure #1. Summer 2008. Exhibition catalogue.
 House Projects. Dublin, Ireland, December 2007. Exhibition Catalogue.
 Disquiet Modern Fuel, Kingston, September 2005. Exhibition Catalogue, Audio CD
 Free Sample Mount Saint Vincent. January 2005. Exhibition Catalogue.
 Almanac Banff Centre, Calgary, December 2005
 QSL Radio Broadcast/Publication, MIMA, UK, Summer 2004
 Aural Cultures. YYZ Books, Spring 2004. Audio piece on accompanying CD.
 Very Short Stories. Off the Cut Press, artist project, December 2003
 5’9", Calgary, artist project, Summer 2003
 New Life for Fire (collaboration with Lee Ranaldo of Sonic Youth), Summer 2003. Audio CD.
 TuTu, Glasgow, artist project, Scotland, Summer 2003
 FUSE Magazine, artist project, January 2003
 Instant Coffee Screensaver, October 2002
 Mix Magazine, artist project, 2001
 Instant Coffee Currency Project, 2001

Gallery Representation
Dyment is currently represented by MKG127 in Toronto.

References 

Living people
21st-century Canadian artists
Year of birth missing (living people)